The 2018 Six Nations Under 20s Championship, was the 11th series of the Six Nations Under 20s Championship, the annual northern hemisphere rugby union championship. England were the defending champions.

Participants

Table

Fixtures

Round 1

Round 2

Round 3

Round 4

Round 5

References

External links
 Under-20 Six Nations

2018
2018 rugby union tournaments for national teams
2017–18 in English rugby union
2017–18 in French rugby union
2017–18 in Irish rugby union
2017–18 in Italian rugby union
2017–18 in Scottish rugby union
2017–18 in Welsh rugby union
Under 20
February 2018 sports events in Europe
March 2018 sports events in Europe